FOST may refer to:
 Force océanique stratégique, the strategic submarine forces of the French Navy.
 Flag Officer Sea Training (India) in the Indian Navy
 Flag Officer Sea Training (Pakistan) in the Pakistani Navy
 Flag Officer Sea Training (United Kingdom) in the Royal Navy (United Kingdom)
 Future of StoryTelling, an annual summit

Fost may refer to:
 Fošt, a settlement in northeastern Slovenia
 Sant Fost de Campsentelles, a village in the province of Barcelona, Spain
 Ingrid Föst (born 1934), a German gymnast